Grace Muneene (born 12 October 1954) is a Zambian sprinter. She competed in the women's 400 metres at the 1972 Summer Olympics.

References

1954 births
Living people
Athletes (track and field) at the 1972 Summer Olympics
Zambian female sprinters
Olympic athletes of Zambia
Place of birth missing (living people)
Olympic female sprinters